The 2020–21 season was Reading's 150th year in existence and eighth consecutive season in the Championship, and covers the period from 23 July 2020 to 30 June 2021.

Season review

Pre-season
On 24 July, the EFL confirmed that the Championship would begin on the weekend of Saturday 12 September 2020.

Transfers and contracts
On 28 July, Reading announced the signing of Josh Laurent to a two-year contract, after his Shrewsbury Town contract expired at the end of the 2019–20 season.

On 3 August, Reading confirmed that Gabriel Osho had declined a new contract with the club after his old contract had expired on 31 July, and had left the club.

On 28 August, Reading confirmed the signing of Ovie Ejaria to a four-year contract from Liverpool.

August
Reading announced their first pre-season friendly on 13 August, an away trip on 28 August to Tottenham Hotspur Stadium to face Tottenham Hotspur.

On 18 August, Reading were drawn at home against Colchester United in the first round of the EFL Cup. The following day Reading announced they'd play Gillingham at home on 22 August in their first pre-season friendly game.

On 21 August, the EFL Championship fixture list was released, with Reading starting their campaign with an away trip to Derby County on 12 September. The following day, Reading faced Gillingham in a friendly at the Madejski Stadium. Two quick-fire goals from Lucas João and Andy Rinomhota gave Reading a 2–0 half time lead. In the second half, John Akinde pulled one back for Gillingham from the penalty with the games ended 2–1 to Reading.

On 28 August, Reading faced Tottenham Hotspur at the Tottenham Hotspur Stadium. Tottenham opened the scoring through an Omar Richards own goal, before goals from Dele Alli and Son Heung-min saw Tottenham take a 3–0 first half lead. In the second half Erik Lamela scored a free-kick before a late George Pușcaș penalty gave Reading a consolation goal to finish the game 4–1 to Tottenham. After the game the club announced that their planned friendly with West Ham United on 1 September was cancelled.

On 29 August, Reading announced the appointment of Veljko Paunović as manager.

On 31 August, Reading announced that as part of their Portuguese training camp, they would face Portimonense in a friendly at the Estádio Municipal de Portimão on 1 September. On the same day, the club confirmed that Mark Bowen had left the club after turning down a new role after being replaced as manager.

September
Reading started the season with a 3–1 home victory over Colchester United in the First Round EFL Cup under the leadership of Eddie Niedzwiecki whilst Veljko Paunović completed his quarantine period. After initially going 1–0 down to a Jevani Brown, Lucas João scored a hat trick to ensure victory and Reading progressed to the Second round of the cup. The following day Reading were drawn at home against Luton Town in the Second round of the EFL Cup, with a home time against Manchester United in the third round if they defeat Luton.

On 8 September, Reading announced the appointment of Quinton Fortune and Nuno Gomes as First Team coaches.

On 10 September, Jordan Holsgrove left the club to sign permanently for Celta Vigo.

Reading's first league game of the season took place on 12 September, against Derby County at Pride Park. Lucas João opened the scoring in the 40th minute, for his fourth goal in two matches, before providing the assist for Ovie Ejaria to double Reading's lead in the 1st minute of added on time at the end of the First Half, and giving Reading a 2–0 victory, to end the first round of games Second in the league.

On 15 September, Reading faced Luton Town at home in the second round of the EFL Cup. A 24th-minute goal from Jordan Clark saw Luton run out winners against a youthful Reading team that saw first team debuts for Dejan Tetek, Nelson Abbey and Lynford Sackey.

Reading's second league game of the season took place on 19 September, with Reading hosting Barnsley. Barnsley defender Michał Helik saw a straight red card in the 42nd minute after pulling back Lucas João, before substitute Yakou Méïté opened the scoring in the 67th minute. One minute later, Mads Juel Andersen was shown a second yellow card, after handling ball, seeing Barnsley down to nine men. Ten minutes later, in the 77th minute, Michael Olise struck a first time volley from the edge of the area to score his first Reading goal and to make it two wins out of two for Reading in the league.

On 22 September, Lewis Gibson joined Reading on a season-long loan deal from Everton.

On 23 September, Marc McNulty was arrested as part of a match fixing prob by Police Scotland.

Reading won their third league game in a row on 26 September, defeating Cardiff City 2–1 at the Cardiff City Stadium. Michael Morrison gave Reading the lead just after halftime with a header from a Michael Olise free kick, with Lucas João doubling the lead just after the hour mark. Lee Tomlin pulled one back for Cardiff City with ten minutes to go, but Reading held out to maintain their one-hundred percent start to the Championship season.

On 30 September, Jeriel Dorsett signed a new contract with Reading until the summer of 2022.

October
On 3 October, Reading hosted Watford at the Madejski Stadium and maintained their perfect start to the Championship season, with a 1–0 victory thanks to a goal from George Pușcaș.

On 4 October, Alfa Semedo joined Reading on a season-long loan deal from Benfica. The following day, 5 October, Reading signed Tomás Esteves on loan from Porto for the remainder of the season, whilst Marc McNulty joined Dundee United on loan for the season.

On 9 October, manager Veljko Paunović was announced as the Championships manager of the month for September.

On 16 October, domestic transfer deadline-day, Sam Smith moved to Tranmere Rovers on loan until 7 January 2021. Reading travelled to Middlesbrough on 17 October, playing out a 0–0 draw to drop their first points of the season. Three days later, they hosted Wycombe Wanderers at the Madejski Stadium, after a goalless first half, Lucas João scored in the 64th minute with their only shot on target to take all three points.
Matchday 7 saw Reading host Rotherham United at the Madejski Stadium on 24 October. Yakou Méïté opened the scoring shortly before halftime, before he doubled the lead in the 79th minute with a bicycle kick from a corner, before an injury time Lucas João penalty finished the game off.

On 27 October, Jökull Andrésson joined Exeter City on an emergency seven-day loan deal.

Reading lost their first league game of the season on 30 October, falling to a 3–2 defeat away to Coventry City at St Andrew's. Coventry took the lead through Gustavo Hamer in the first half, before Lucas João scored his ninth goal of the season to tie the game in the 66th minute. Matt Godden and Sam McCallum both scored late in the game to give Coventry City a 3–1 lead heading in to injury time, where George Pușcaș scored to finish the game 3–2.

Towards the end of October, Reading signed teenage Guinea-Bissau winger Mamadi Camará to a two-year contract from Feirense.

November
On 2 November, Andrésson's loan at Exeter City was extended for a further week.

Reading lost their second league game in a row on 4 November, with Preston North End running out 3–0 winners at Madejski Stadium. 3 days later, Reading suffered their third defeat in a row, and second 3–0 defeat in a row as Stoke City came away from the Madejski Stadium with the win.

Andrésson extended his loan at Exeter City for a third week on 10 November, a fourth on 17 November, and for a fifth time on 24 November.

December
On 15 December, Nelson Abbey signed his first professional contract with Reading, until the summer of 2022, and Reading confirmed that Omri Luzon had joined the U23 squad on a contract until June 2021.

On 23 December, Sam Walker joined Blackpool on a seven-day emergency loan. After making his debut for Blackpool on 29 December, Walkers loan deal was extended for a further seven days.

January
On 12 January, Reading's EFL Championship game against Brentford scheduled for 16 January, was postponed due to the COVID-19 cases within the Brentford squad.

Transfers
On 11 January, Sam Walker moved to AFC Wimbledon on loan for the remainder of the season.

On 22 January, Jökull Andrésson joined Morecambe on a week-long emergency loan deal. After facing Exeter City in his second and final game whilst on loan for Morecambe, Andrésson returned to Exeter City on loan for the remainder of the season on 29 January. On the same day, Sam Smith joined Cheltenham Town on loan for the remainder of the season.

February
On 3 February, Mamadi Camará signed his first professional contract with Reading, until the summer of 2022.

On 25 February, Nahum Melvin-Lambert signed his first professional contract with the Reading, until the summer of 2022 before joining St Patrick's Athletic on loan until June.

April
On 30 April, Michael Olise was named as the EA Sports Young Player of the Season and listed in the Sky Bet Championship Team of the Season.

May
On 7 May, Reading announced that Luke Southwood had signed a new two-year contract, keeping him at the club until the summer of 2023.

Prior to Reading's last game of the season, on 8 May, Josh Laurent was announced as the club's player of the season.

On 11 May, Reading announced that Michael Morrison had signed a new one-year contract with the club, whilst new contracts had also been offered to Tom McIntyre, Omar Richards, James Holden, Thierry Nevers and Femi Azeez with Ethan Bristow having a clause triggered in his contract to keep him at the club. Scholars Kian Leavy, Harvey Collins, Kelvin Ehibhatiomhan, Malachi Talent-Aryeety and Lynford Sackey were all offered professional contracts too. Reading also announced that Sone Aluko, Sam Baldock, Sam Walker, Tennai Watson, Ryan East, Conor Lawless, Oliver Pendlebury, Jayden Onen, Sam Smith, Joseph Ajose, Josh Hewitt, Omri Luzon, Augustus McGiff, Alfie Anderson, Jordan Hamilton-Olise and Yaw Turkson would all leave the club at the end of their contracts. The following day, 12 May, James Holden joined Maidenhead United on loan for the remainder of the season.

On 25 May, Reading announced that they had activated a clause in Thierry Nevers' contract, extending his contract until the summer of 2022 whilst also confirming he would be joining West Ham United for an undisclosed fee once the transfer window opens on 9 June.

Transfers

In

Loans in

Out

 Nevers' move was announced on the above date, but was not active until 9 June 2021.

Loans out

Released

Trial

Squad

Out on loan

Left club during season

Friendlies

U23

Competitions

Overview

Championship

League table

Results summary

Results by matchday

Results

EFL Cup

FA Cup

The third round draw was made on 30 November, with Premier League and EFL Championship clubs all entering the competition.

Squad statistics

Appearances and goals

|-
|colspan="14"|Players away on loan:

|-
|colspan="14"|Players who appeared for Reading but left during the season:
|}

Goal scorers

Clean sheets

Disciplinary record

Awards

Manager of the Month

EA Sports Young Player of the Season

Sky Bet Championship Team of the Season

References

Match reports 

Reading
Reading F.C. seasons